Telaga Biru or Telaga Biru Football Club, is a Indonesian football team based in 23 January Stadium, Gorontalo Regency, Gorontalo Province. This team competes in Liga 3 Gorontalo Zone.

Honours
Liga 3 Gorontalo
Semi-finalist: 2019

References

External links

Association football clubs established in 1942
1942 establishments in the Dutch East Indies
Football clubs in Indonesia
Football clubs in Gorontalo
Gorontalo Regency